The Buttermilks, or Buttermilk Country, is a well known bouldering destination near Bishop, California. It comprises the western edge of the Owens Valley, in the eastern foothills of the Sierra Nevada.

Buttermilk Country is renowned for its large "highball" boulders, made of quartz monzonite. The boulders in the Buttermilks are glacial erratics, meaning they don't match the rest of the rock found in the area because they were carried by glaciers from far away.

See also
Fontainebleau rock climbing, major bouldering area in France

References 

Hills of California
Rock formations of California
Landforms of Inyo County, California
Landforms of the Sierra Nevada (United States)
Owens Valley
Climbing areas of California
Tourist attractions in Inyo County, California